Tom Takubo is a Republican member of the West Virginia Senate, representing the 17th district since January 14, 2015. Takubo also serves as Majority Leader of the West Virginia Senate, succeeding Ryan Ferns who was defeated in the 2018 West Virginia Senate election.

Takubo's mother is from Logan County and his biological father was from Japan. Takubo's parents divorced when he was a child, and his mother remarried. He attended Marshall University and received his D.O. from the West Virginia School of Osteopathic Medicine. He is a business owner and serves on the medical faculty for West Virginia University. Takubo has three children. He lives in the Southridge area of South Charleston.

Election results

2018: Takubo ran for re-election in 2018 and was unopposed in the May Republican primary. Takubo faced Terrell Ellis, a longtime Kanawha County community and economic developer, in the November general election. Despite being outspent in the race, Takubo beat Ellis by a slim 52.5%-47.5% margin to win a second term.

2014: After 16 years in the Senate, Democratic Senator and small business owner Brooks McCabe retired, leaving an open seat in District 17. Takubo, a doctor and small business owner, ran for the seat and faced Lance Wheeler in the Republican primary. Takubo beat Wheeler by a 68%-32% margin to advance to the November general election, where he faced Democratic nominee Delegate and Assistant Majority Whip Doug Skaff and Mountain Party nominee Jesse Johnson. Takubo beat Skaff and Johnson as part of a Republican wave election that saw Republicans take both chambers of the West Virginia Legislature for the first time in eight decades.

References

1971 births
21st-century American politicians
American osteopathic physicians
Living people
Marshall University alumni
People from South Charleston, West Virginia
Physicians from West Virginia
Politicians from Columbus, Ohio
West Virginia School of Osteopathic Medicine alumni
Republican Party West Virginia state senators
American politicians of Japanese descent
Asian conservatism in the United States